This is a list of Armenian football transfers in the winter transfer window, by club. Only clubs of the 2021–22 Armenian Premier League are included.

Armenian Premier League 2021-22

Alashkert

In:

Out:

Ararat-Armenia

In:

Out:

Ararat Yerevan

In:

Out:

BKMA Yerevan

In:

Out:

Noah

In:

Out:

Noravank

In:

Out:

Pyunik

In:

Out:

Sevan

In:

Out:

Urartu

In:

Out:

Van

In:

Out:

References

Armenia
Winter 2021–22
2021–22 in Armenian football